Tomoxena dives is a species of comb-footed spider in the family Theridiidae. It is found in India.

References

Theridiidae
Spiders described in 1895
Spiders of the Indian subcontinent